was a private junior college in Ota, Gunma, Japan, established in 1999. It closed in fiscal 2011, and the site now forms the secondary school campus of Gunma Kokusai Academy.

References

External links
  

Educational institutions established in 1999
Private universities and colleges in Japan
Universities and colleges in Gunma Prefecture
Japanese junior colleges
1999 establishments in Japan